was a Japanese essayist and astronomer.  He was a brother of the novelist Nojiri Haruhikoˀ, whose pen name was Osaragi Jirō.

In 1930 he coined the Japanese word  for the then-newly-discovered dwarf planet Pluto. The name was then borrowed into Chinese and Korean.

See also   
 Osaragi Jirō [information on family]  
 3008 Nojiri (main-belt asteroid)

References 

1885 births
1977 deaths
20th-century Japanese astronomers
Japanese writers
People from Yokohama